is a Japanese journalist.

Biography 

Kobayashi was born in Tokyo on July 12, 1979. She graduated from Aoyama Gakuin University. After working for TBS as a presenter, she become a freelance presenter in 2009, but continued to work on TBS programs. She was formerly affiliated with Cent Force and is currently affiliated with Ikushima Planning.

References

1979 births
Living people
Japanese television journalists
Japanese women journalists
Japanese announcers
Japanese television presenters
Japanese women television presenters
Aoyama Gakuin University alumni